John Trodd (19 July 1828 – 26 October 1858) was an English first-class cricketer.

Trodd was born at Stoke next Guildford in July 1828. He made a single appearance in first-class cricket in 1855 for the Surrey Club against the Marylebone Cricket Club (MCC) at Lord's. He batted in both Surrey Club innings', being dismissed without scoring by James Grundy in their first-innings, while in their second-innings he was unbeaten on 4. He also bowled eight wicket-less overs in the MCC first-innings. He died at Bromborough Pool, Cheshire, in October 1858. His brother, William, was also a first-class cricketer.

References

External links

1828 births
1858 deaths
People from Guildford
English cricketers
Surrey Club cricketers